The 2001 Nebraska Cornhuskers baseball team represented the University of Nebraska in the 2001 NCAA Division I baseball season. The head coach was Dave Van Horn, serving his 4th year.

The Cornhuskers lost in the College World Series, defeated by the Tulane Green Wave.

Roster

Schedule 

! style="" | Regular Season (41–14)
|- valign="top" 

|- align="center" bgcolor="#ffdddd"
| 1 || February 9 || at No. 7  || No. 4 || Reckling Park • Houston, Texas || L 2–16 || 0–1 || 0–0
|- align="center" bgcolor="#ddffdd"
| 2 || February 10 || vs.  || No. 4 || Reckling Park • Houston, Texas || W 10–4 || 1–1 || 0–0
|- align="center" bgcolor="#ffdddd"
| 3 || February 11 || vs. No. 1  || No. 4 || Reckling Park • Houston, Texas || L 8–15 || 1–2 || 0–0
|- align="center" bgcolor="#ddffdd"
| 4 || February 16 || at  || No. 7 || Lobo Field • Albuquerque, New Mexico || W 14–7 || 2–2 || 0–0
|- align="center" bgcolor="#ffdddd"
| 5 || February 17 || vs.  || No. 7 || Lobo Field • Albuquerque, New Mexico || L 6–7 || 2–3 || 0–0
|- align="center" bgcolor="#ddffdd"
| 6 || February 18 || vs.  || No. 7 || Lobo Field • Albuquerque, New Mexico || W 14–0 || 3–3 || 0–0
|- align="center" bgcolor="#ddffdd"
| 7 || February 23 || vs.  || No. 11 || M. L. Tigue Moore Field at Russo Park • Lafayette, Louisiana || W 10–5 || 4–3 || 0–0
|- align="center" bgcolor="#ddffdd"
| 8 || February 24 || at  || No. 11 || M. L. Tigue Moore Field at Russo Park • Lafayette, Louisiana || W 6–3 || 5–3 || 0–0
|- align="center" bgcolor="#ddffdd"
| 9 || February 25 || vs. No. 25  || No. 11 || M. L. Tigue Moore Field at Russo Park • Lafayette, Louisiana || W 8–7 || 6–3 || 0–0
|-

|- align="center" bgcolor="#ddffdd"
| 10 || March 2 || at  || No. 12 || Dan Law Field • Lubbock, Texas || W 3–2 || 7–3 || 1–0
|- align="center" bgcolor="#ddffdd"
| 11 || March 3 || at Texas Tech || No. 12 || Dan Law Field • Lubbock, Texas || W 8–7 || 8–3 || 2–0
|- align="center" bgcolor="#ddffdd"
| 12 || March 4 || at Texas Tech || No. 12 || Dan Law Field • Lubbock, Texas || W 10–8 || 9–3 || 3–0
|- align="center" bgcolor="#ddffdd"
| 13 || March 6 || at  || No. 11 || Thunderbird Park • Cedar City, Utah || W 18–6 || 10–3 || 3–0
|- align="center" bgcolor="#ddffdd"
| 14 || March 6 || at Southern Utah || No. 11 || Thunderbird Park • Cedar City, Utah || W 12–9 || 11–3 || 3–0
|- align="center" bgcolor="#ddffdd"
| 15 || March 9 ||  || No. 11 || Buck Beltzer Stadium • Lincoln, Nebraska || W 9–6 || 12–3 || 4–0
|- align="center" bgcolor="#ddffdd"
| 16 || March 13 || at  || No. 5 || J. C. Love Field • Ruston, Louisiana || W 13–2 || 13–3 || 4–0
|- align="center" bgcolor="#ddffdd"
| 17 || March 15 || at  || No. 5 || H. Alvin Brown–C. C. Stroud Field • Natchitoches, Louisiana || W 13–1 || 14–3 || 4–0
|- align="center" bgcolor="#ddffdd"
| 18 || March 16 || at  || No. 5 || Shehee Stadium • Shreveport, Louisiana || W 17–4 || 15–3 || 4–0
|- align="center" bgcolor="#ffdddd"
| 19 || March 16 || at Centenary || No. 5 || Shehee Stadium • Shreveport, Louisiana || L 8–9 || 15–4 || 4–0
|- align="center" bgcolor="#ddffdd"
| 20 || March 17 || at Centenary || No. 5 || Shehee Stadium • Shreveport, Louisiana || W 12–1 || 16–4 || 4–0
|- align="center" bgcolor="#ffdddd"
| 21 || March 20 || at Wichita State || No. 5 || Eck Stadium • Wichita, Kansas || L 5–6 || 16–5 || 4–0
|- align="center" bgcolor="#ddffdd"
| 22 || March 24 || Missouri || No. 5 || Buck Beltzer Stadium • Lincoln, Nebraska || W 14–4 || 17–5 || 5–0
|- align="center" bgcolor="#ffdddd"
| 23 || March 24 || Missouri || No. 5 || Buck Beltzer Stadium • Lincoln, Nebraska || L 2–6 || 17–6 || 5–1
|- align="center" bgcolor="#ffdddd"
| 24 || March 25 || Missouri || No. 5 || Buck Beltzer Stadium • Lincoln, Nebraska || L 2–3 || 17–7 || 5–2
|- align="center" bgcolor="#ddffdd"
| 25 || March 28 ||  || No. 15 || Buck Beltzer Stadium • Lincoln, Nebraska || W 16–10 || 18–7 || 5–2
|- align="center" bgcolor="#ddffdd"
| 26 || March 28 || Milwaukee || No. 15 || Buck Beltzer Stadium • Lincoln, Nebraska || W 16–2 || 19–7 || 5–2
|- align="center" bgcolor="#ddffdd"
| 27 || March 30 || at  || No. 15 || L. Dale Mitchell Baseball Park • Norman, Oklahoma || W 7–1 || 20–7 || 6–2
|-

|- align="center" bgcolor="#ddffdd"
| 28 || April 1 || at Oklahoma || No. 15 || L. Dale Mitchell Baseball Park • Norman, Oklahoma || W 10–5 || 21–7 || 7–2
|- align="center" bgcolor="#ddffdd"
| 29 || April 2 || at Oklahoma || No. 15 || L. Dale Mitchell Baseball Park • Norman, Oklahoma || W 14–4 || 22–7 || 8–2
|- align="center" bgcolor="#ddffdd"
| 30 || April 4 ||  || No. 10 || Buck Beltzer Stadium • Lincoln, Nebraska || W 14–9 || 23–7 || 8–2
|- align="center" bgcolor="#ddffdd"
| 31 || April 7 || No. 18  || No. 10 || Buck Beltzer Stadium • Lincoln, Nebraska || W 10–8 || 24–7 || 9–2
|- align="center" bgcolor="#ddffdd"
| 32 || April 7 || No. 18 Texas || No. 10 || Buck Beltzer Stadium • Lincoln, Nebraska || W 5–4 || 25–7 || 10–2
|- align="center" bgcolor="#ffdddd"
| 33 || April 8 || No. 18 Texas || No. 10 || Buck Beltzer Stadium • Lincoln, Nebraska || L 1–2 || 25–8 || 10–3
|- align="center" bgcolor="#ddffdd"
| 34 || April 10 || Southern Utah || No. 5 || Buck Beltzer Stadium • Lincoln, Nebraska || W 5–2 || 26–8 || 10–3
|- align="center" bgcolor="#ddffdd"
| 35 || April 10 || Southern Utah || No. 5 || Buck Beltzer Stadium • Lincoln, Nebraska || W 13–3 || 27–8 || 10–3
|- align="center" bgcolor="#ddffdd"
| 36 || April 13 || No. 12  || No. 5 || Buck Beltzer Stadium • Lincoln, Nebraska || W 6–2 || 28–8 || 11–3
|- align="center" bgcolor="#ddffdd"
| 37 || April 14 || No. 12 Baylor || No. 5 || Buck Beltzer Stadium • Lincoln, Nebraska || W 6–4 || 29–8 || 12–3
|- align="center" bgcolor="#ddffdd"
| 38 || April 15 || No. 12 Baylor || No. 5 || Buck Beltzer Stadium • Lincoln, Nebraska || W 10–4 || 30–8 || 13–3
|- align="center" bgcolor="#ddffdd"
| 39 || April 17 ||  || No. 5 || Buck Beltzer Stadium • Lincoln, Nebraska || W 17–0 || 31–8 || 13–3
|- align="center" bgcolor="#ddffdd"
| 40 || April 18 || UTSA || No. 5 || Buck Beltzer Stadium • Lincoln, Nebraska || W 16–6 || 32–8 || 13–3
|- align="center" bgcolor="#ddffdd"
| 41 || April 20 || at  || No. 5 || Hoglund Ballpark • Lawrence, Kansas || W 9–0 || 33–8 || 14–3
|- align="center" bgcolor="#ddffdd"
| 42 || April 21 || at Kansas || No. 5 || Hoglund Ballpark • Lawrence, Kansas || W 5–2 || 34–8 || 15–3
|- align="center" bgcolor="#ffdddd"
| 43 || April 22 || at Kansas || No. 5 || Hoglund Ballpark • Lawrence, Kansas || L 3–12 || 34–9 || 15–4
|- align="center" bgcolor="#ffdddd"
| 44 || April 24 || Creighton || No. 4 || Buck Beltzer Stadium • Lincoln, Nebraska || L 8–11 || 34–10 || 15–4
|- align="center" bgcolor="#ddffdd"
| 45 || April 27 || at  || No. 4 || Olsen Field at Blue Bell Park • College Station, Texas || W 6–4 || 35–10 || 16–4
|- align="center" bgcolor="#ffdddd"
| 46 || April 28 || at Texas A&M || No. 4 || Olsen Field at Blue Bell Park • College Station, Texas || L 8–11 || 35–11 || 16–5
|- align="center" bgcolor="#ffdddd"
| 47 || April 29 || at Texas A&M || No. 4 || Olsen Field at Blue Bell Park • College Station, Texas || L 4–5 || 35–12 || 16–6
|-

|- align="center" bgcolor="#ddffdd"
| 48 || May 5 ||  || No. 7 || Buck Beltzer Stadium • Lincoln, Nebraska || W 9–7 || 36–12 || 17–6
|- align="center" bgcolor="#ddffdd"
| 49 || May 5 || Oklahoma State || No. 7 || Buck Beltzer Stadium • Lincoln, Nebraska || W 10–8 || 37–12 || 18–6
|- align="center" bgcolor="#ddffdd"
| 50 || May 6 || Oklahoma State || No. 7 || Buck Beltzer Stadium • Lincoln, Nebraska || W 20–2 || 38–12 || 19–6
|- align="center" bgcolor="#ddffdd"
| 51 || May 8 ||  || No. 5 || Buck Beltzer Stadium • Lincoln, Nebraska || W 15–6 || 39–12 || 19–6
|- align="center" bgcolor="#ddffdd"
| 52 || May 9 || at Creighton || No. 5 || Johnny Rosenblatt Stadium • Omaha, Nebraska || W 8–4 || 40–12 || 19–6
|- align="center" bgcolor="#ddffdd"
| 53 || May 11 || at   || No. 5 || Cap Timm Field • Ames, Iowa || W 16–8 || 41–12 || 20–6
|- align="center" bgcolor="#ffdddd"
| 54 || May 12 || at Iowa State  || No. 5 || Cap Timm Field • Ames, Iowa || L 5–8 || 41–13 || 20–7
|- align="center" bgcolor="#ffdddd"
| 55 || May 13 || at Iowa State  || No. 5 || Cap Timm Field • Ames, Iowa || L 1–5 || 41–14 || 20–8
|-

|-
|-
! style="" | Postseason (9–2)
|- valign="top"

|- align="center" bgcolor="#ddffdd"
| 56 || May 16 || vs. (8) Iowa State || (1) No. 5 || AT&T Bricktown Ballpark • Oklahoma City, Oklahoma || W 5–2 || 42–14 || 1–0
|- align="center" bgcolor="#ddffdd"
| 57 || May 17 || vs. (5) Oklahoma State || (1) No. 5 || AT&T Bricktown Ballpark • Oklahoma City, Oklahoma || W 7–1 || 43–14 || 2–0
|- align="center" bgcolor="#ddffdd"
| 58 || May 19 || vs. (5) Oklahoma State || (1) No. 5 || AT&T Bricktown Ballpark • Oklahoma City, Oklahoma || W 10–5 || 44–14 || 3–0
|- align="center" bgcolor="#ddffdd"
| 59 || May 20 || vs. (6) Texas A&M || (1) No. 5 || AT&T Bricktown Ballpark • Oklahoma City, Oklahoma || W 7–4 || 45–14 || 4–0
|- valign="top"

|- align="center" bgcolor="#ddffdd"
| 60 || May 25 || (4) Northern Iowa || (1) No. 3 || Buck Beltzer Stadium • Lincoln, Nebraska || W 16–6 || 46–14 || 1–0
|- align="center" bgcolor="#ddffdd"
| 61 || May 26 || (2)  || (1) No. 3 || Buck Beltzer Stadium • Lincoln, Nebraska || W 5–4 || 47–14 || 2–0
|- align="center" bgcolor="#ddffdd"
| 62 || May 27 || (2) Rutgers || (1) No. 3 || Buck Beltzer Stadium • Lincoln, Nebraska || W 14–10 || 48–14 || 3–0
|- valign="top"

|- align="center" bgcolor="#ddffdd"
| 63 || June 1 || No. 16 Rice || (8) No. 3 || Buck Beltzer Stadium • Lincoln, Nebraska || W 7–0 || 49–14 || 4–0
|- align="center" bgcolor="#ddffdd"
| 64 || June 2 || No. 16 Rice || (8) No. 3 || Buck Beltzer Stadium • Lincoln, Nebraska || W 9–6 || 50–14 || 5–0
|-

|- align="center" bgcolor="#ffdddd"
| 65 || June 8 || vs. (1) No. 5  || (8) No. 3 || Johnny Rosenblatt Stadium • Omaha, Nebraska || L 4–5 || 50–15 || 0–1
|- align="center" bgcolor="#ffdddd"
| 66 || June 10 || vs. (5) No. 6  || (8) No. 3 || Johnny Rosenblatt Stadium • Omaha, Nebraska || L 5–6 || 50–16 || 0–2
|-

Awards and honors 
Jeff Blevins
 Honorable Mention All-Big 12

Jim Cole
 First Team All-Big 12
 First-Team All-American ABCA
 First-Team All-American Baseball America
 Second Team All-American The Sports Network
 Third Team All-American Collegiate Baseball

Matt Hopper
 First Team All-Big 12

Dan Johnson
 Second Team All-American American Baseball Coaches Association
 Second Team All-American Collegiate Baseball
 First Team All-Big 12

Shane Komine
 Second Team All-American American Baseball Coaches Association
 Second Team All-American Baseball America
 Second Team All-American The Sports Network
 Big 12 Conference Baseball Pitcher of the Year
 First Team All-Big 12

Jeff Leise
 Second Team All-Big 12

Jed Morris
 Second Team All-Big 12

Thom Ott
 First Team All-Big 12

Adam Stern
 Honorable Mention All-Big 12

References 

Nebraska Cornhuskers baseball seasons
Nebraska Cornhuskers baseball
Big 12 Conference baseball champion seasons
Nebraska
College World Series seasons
Nebraska